Esther Mbulakubuza Mbayo (née Esther Mbulakubuza), is a Ugandan politician. She is the Minister of the Presidency in the Ugandan Cabinet. She was appointed to that position on 6 June 2016, replacing Frank Tumwebaze, who was appointed Ministry of Information Information Technology and Communication. She also serves in the Parliament of Uganda, as the Luuka District Women's Representative.

Background and education
She was born in present-day Luuka District, in Busoga sub-region, in the Eastern Region of Uganda, on 27 April 1971. She studied at Wanyange Girls' School for both her O-Level and A-Level education. She attended Makerere University, graduating in 2005, with a Bachelor of Commerce, with specialization in accounting. She also holds a certificate awarded by the Institute of Chartered Secretaries and Administrators.

Career
In 1997, she served as an internal auditor for Transocean Uganda Limited. From November 1999 until 2002, she worked as an accounts assistant at Lonrho Motors Uganda Limited, a private automobile dealership in Kampala. From January 2003 until February 2006, she worked as an accountant at Lonrho Motors. She then went to work at Commercial Firms Uganda Limited as an accountant, from April 2006 until August 2007. Concomitantly, from September 2001 until June 2008, she worked as an accountant at Socket Works Uganda Limited. From February 2008 until December 2010, she worked as a financial controller at Cooper Motor Corporation Uganda. She was elected as the Luuka District Woman member of parliament at the 2016 general election, defeating incumbent Evelyn Kaabule. She had earlier defeated Kaabule in the NRM primary. On 6 June 2016, she was appointed Cabinet Minister of the Presidency.

In the 2021 Uganda presidential and parliamentary elections, Mbayon won another term of office(2021-2026)

Other responsibilities
She concurrently serves as the Chairperson of the district Women's League in the ruling National Resistance Movement political party and as Secretary of Busoga Women Leader’s Association.

Personal life 
Esther Mbayo is married to George William Mbayo and the couple has three children. In November 2020, she lost her only son Ian Mawanda who died of heart complications after rigorous body work outs at the gym.

See also
 Cabinet of Uganda
 Parliament of Uganda

References

Living people
Luuka District
Busoga
Eastern Region, Uganda
Members of the Parliament of Uganda
Government ministers of Uganda
Makerere University alumni
1971 births
Women government ministers of Uganda
Women members of the Parliament of Uganda
National Resistance Movement politicians
21st-century Ugandan politicians
21st-century Ugandan women politicians